The 2013–2014 season was FK Sarajevo's 65th season in history, and their 20th consecutive season in the top flight of Bosnian football.

Players

Squad

 (Captain)

 (Captain)

Statistics

Kit

Friendlies

Competitions

Premier League

League table

Matches

Cup of Bosnia and Herzegovina

Round of 32

Round of 16

Quarter-finals

Semi-finals

Final

UEFA Europa League

First qualifying round

Second qualifying round

References

FK Sarajevo seasons
Sarajevo